Israelites, ancient Hebrew people

Israelite or in plural Israelites may refer to:

Places
 Israelite Bay, a bay in Western Australia
Israelite highland settlement, ancient Israelite settlement in the highlands north of Jerusalem discovered in archaeological field surveys conducted in Israel since the 1970s
 Israelite Tower, an archaeological site in Jerusalem's Jewish Quarter

People
Dean Israelite (born 1984), South African film director, writer, and producer
David Israelite, American music executive

Media
 The Israelite, presently The American Israelite, published weekly in Cincinnati, Ohio, the oldest Jewish newspaper in the United States

Others
 "Israelites" (song), a 1969 song by Desmond Dekker & The Aces
 Israʼiliyyat, the body of narratives originating from Jewish and Christian traditions

See also
 Israeli (disambiguation)
 Alliance Israélite Universelle, Paris-based international Jewish organization
 Black Hebrew Israelites (also called Hebrew Israelites, Black Hebrews, Black Israelites, and African Hebrew Israelites), groups of African Americans who believe that they are the descendants of the ancient Israelites
 Israelite Church of God in Jesus Christ, an organization of Black Hebrew Israelites